The 77th Pennsylvania House of Representatives District is located in central Pennsylvania and has been represented since 2007 by H. Scott Conklin.

District profile
The 77th District is entirely located within Centre County and includes the following areas: 

Ferguson Township (PART, District Northeast)
Halfmoon Township
Huston Township
Patton Township
Philipsburg
Port Matilda
Rush Township
Taylor Township
State College (part)
District East Central (part)
Division 02
District Northwest, South (part)
Division 01 
District West and West Central
Worth Township

Representatives

Recent election results

References

External links
District Map from the United States Census Bureau
Pennsylvania House Legislative District Maps from the Pennsylvania Redistricting Commission.  
Population Data for District 77 from  the Pennsylvania Redistricting Commission.

Government of Centre County, Pennsylvania
77